Anotogaster nipalensis is a species of dragonfly in the genus Anotogaster. It’s in the family Cordulegastridae. It was described by Edmond de Sélys Longchamps in 1854.

References 

Cordulegastridae
Insects described in 1854